Gopichand Meena (born 15 July 1975) is a member of the Rajasthan Legislative Assembly from Jahazpur constituency.

References

1975 births
People from Bhilwara
Rajasthan MLAs 2018–2023
Bharatiya Janata Party politicians from Rajasthan
Living people